Dibekli is a village in Gümüşhane Province, Turkey at .

References

Villages in Gümüşhane Province